Sonora State Highway 56 (Carretera Estatal 56) is a highway in the south of the Mexican state of Sonora.

It runs from the junction with Sonora State Highway 149 and Highway to Bacobampo to Huatabampo.

References

056